Dienochlor is an organochlorine compound included in the group of cyclic chlorinated hydrocarbons. Dienochlor is mostly used as a pesticide and ovicide.

Synthesis
Dienochlor can be obtained by catalytic reduction of hexachlorocyclopentadiene (e.g. with copper or hydrogen).

Properties
Dienochlor is a combustible yellow solid which is practically insoluble in water. It decomposes when heated above 250 °C. It decomposes rapidly under the influence of sunlight.

Applications
Dienochlor is used as an acaricide under the trade name Pentac for combating mites (Tetranychus, Polyphagotarsonemus latus) on roses, chrysanthemums, and other ornamental plants.

Regulations
Dienochlor was approved for use in the Western Germany between 1971 and 1990. In the European Union, no plant protection products containing dienochlor are authorized.

References

Organochlorides
Acaricides